Neil Allison Campbell (April 17, 1946 – October 21, 2004) was an American scientist known best for his textbook, Biology, first published in 1987 and repeatedly through many subsequent editions. The title is popular worldwide and has been used by over 700,000 students in both high school and college-level classes.

Education
Campbell earned his M.S. in zoology from the University of California, Los Angeles and his Ph.D. in Plant Biology from the University of California, Riverside. He taught collegiate classes for over 30 years at Cornell University, Pomona College, University of California, Riverside, and San Bernardino Valley College.

Work
Campbell received multiple awards: the Distinguished Alumnus Award from University of California, Riverside in 2001 and the first ever Outstanding Professor Award from San Bernardino Valley College in 1986.

Campbell was also a researcher who studied desert and coastal plants. He conducted research on how certain plants would adjust in environments with different salinity, temperature, and pH. In addition, he conducted studies on the Mimosa plant and other legumes.

Death
Campbell died on 21 October 2004 of heart failure just after the manuscript for the seventh international edition of Biology was completed. The Neil Allison Campbell Endowed Research Award was created at UC Riverside to honor his memory.

References

External links
Official website of Campbell Biology

1946 births
2004 deaths
American textbook writers
American male non-fiction writers
California State University, Long Beach alumni
University of California, Riverside alumni
University of California, Los Angeles alumni
University of California, Riverside faculty
Cornell University faculty
Pomona College faculty
American biologists
20th-century biologists
20th-century American male writers